The following is a list of dams in Hyogo Prefecture, Japan.

List

See also

References 

Hyogo